Stoney is a given name, nickname, stage name and surname. Notable people with the name include:

Given name, nickname or stage name
 Stoney Burke (born 1953), American  street performer and actor
 Stoney Case (born 1972), American football quarterback
 Stoney Cooper (1918–1977), American fiddle and guitar player
 Stoney Curtis, American pornographic actor, director and producer
 Stoney Edwards (1929–1997), American singer
 Peter Emshwiller (born 1959), American novelist, artist, magazine editor, filmmaker, screenwriter and actor
 Stoney Jackson (born 1960), American actor
 Stoney McGlynn (1872–1941), American baseball player
 Stoney LaRue (born 1977), American singer-songwriter
 Carl Stonehewer (born 1972), English former motorcycle speedway ride
 Stoney Willis (1912–1994), American football quarterback
 Stoney Woodson (born 1985), American football cornerback
Stoney, character in Encino Man

Surname
 A. Burnet Stoney (1892–1973), American football coach
 Andrew Robinson Stoney (1747–1810), Anglo-Irish adventurer
 Bindon Blood Stoney (1828–1909), Irish engineer
 Casey Stoney (born 1982), English association football player
 Clementine Stoney (born 1981), Australian swimmer
 Edith Anne Stoney (1869–1938), Anglo-Irish medical physicist
 Florence Stoney (1870–1932), Irish radiologist
 Francis Goold Morony Stoney (1837–1897), Irish engineer
 George C. Stoney (1916–2012), American filmmaker and film educator
 George Johnstone Stoney (1826–1911), Anglo-Irish physicist
 Graeme Stoney (born 1940), Australian politician
 James M. Stoney (1888–1965), American bishop
 Jim Stoney (1888–1965), American football guard, coach, and church rector
 Kevin Stoney (1921–2008), English actor
 Levar Stoney (born 1981), American politician from Virginia
 Thomas Porcher Stoney (1889–1973), American politician from South Carolina
 William Stoney (1898–1980), British swimmer

Lists of people by nickname